Soe Win Tun (born 1 May 1990) is a Burmese politician who currently serves as a Sagaing Region Hluttaw member of parliament for Wetlet Township № 2 Constituency. He is a member of the National League for Democracy and the youngest MP of Sagaing Region Hluttaw.

Early life 
Tun was born on 1 May 1990 in Wetlet, Sagaing Region, Myanmar. He graduated from Shwebo University with a B.A in history. He had served as the charge of NLD Wetlet Township Youth.

Political career
Tun is a member of the National League for Democracy. He was elected as a Sagaing Region Hluttaw MP, winning a majority of 46,399 votes, from Wetlet Township № 2 parliamentary constituency.

References 

National League for Democracy politicians
1990 births
Living people
People from Sagaing Region